National Road 70 (abbreviated as EO70) is a single carriageway road in southern Greece. It connects Corinth with Argos, via Epidavros and Nafplio. It is situated in the regional units Corinthia and Argolis, in the Peloponnese peninsula.

Route

The northern end of the GR-70 is 5 km east of Corinth, where it is connected with the Greek National Road 8 (Megara - Corinth). It runs south, following the west coast of the Saronic Gulf, until Epidaurus, where it turns west. It crosses the Argolid peninsula and reaches the coast of the Argolic Gulf at Nafplio. It continues northwest to its terminus, Argos.

National Road 70 passes through the following places:
Isthmia
Kechries
Kato Almyri
Sofiko
Nea Epidavros
Palaia Epidavros
Lygourio
Nafplio
Dalamanara
Argos

Argolis
Corinthia
70
Roads in Peloponnese (region)